Vimba elongata is a European freshwater fish species in the family Cyprinidae. Inhabits the basin of upper Danube: alpian lakes of upper Austria and southern Bavaria.

References

 Vimba elongata at FishBase

Vimba
Fauna of Austria
Fauna of Germany
Cyprinid fish of Europe
Fish described in 1844